Eressa ichneumoniformis is a moth of the family Erebidae. It was described by Rothschild in 1910. It is found in India.

References

 Natural History Museum Lepidoptera generic names catalog

Eressa
Moths described in 1910